Osorno (Mapuche: Chauracavi) is a city and commune in southern Chile and capital of Osorno Province in the Los Lagos Region. It had a population of 145,475, as of the 2002 census. It is a gateway for land access to the far south regions of Aysén and Magallanes, which would otherwise be accessible only by sea or air from the rest of the country.

Located at the confluence of Rahue and Damas River, Osorno is the main service centre of agriculture and cattle farming in the northern Los Lagos Region. The city's cultural heritage is shaped by Huilliche, Spanish, and German influences.

History

Prehistory

The city of Osorno is built upon river terraces formed during the last of Earth's geological periods —the Quaternary. 130,000 years ago, during the transition from the Santa María glaciation and the Valdivia interglacial the area of Osorno was covered by pyroclastic material derivative from large and explosive volcanic eruptions in the Andes. The substrate of Osorno is accordingly made of various combinations of volcanic ash, lapilli, sand and gravel with occasional layers of peat. The city hosts the paleontological and archaeological site of Pilauco Bajo, where human footprints and lithic artifacts dating to the Late Pleistocene have been found. There is an adjoining museum and park dedicated to the site.

Old Osorno
The city was originally planned to be founded in 1553, under the Government of Pedro de Valdivia by his companion of conquest, Lieutenant General Don Francisco de Villagra; with the name of Santa Marina de Gaete, on the site of a Huilliche village named Chauracavi. However, Valdivia's death prevented the realization of this plan before it could materialize.
 
On 27 March 1558, the city was finally founded by governor García Hurtado de Mendoza, with the new name of Villa de San Mateo de Osorno, in honor of his grandfather, Count of Osorno. Osorno is a municipio in Palencia province, Castile and León, Spain. In the summer of 1567, various settlers of Osorno joined Ruiz de Gamboa's expedition to Chiloé Archipelago. On December 1575 Osorno was struck a major earthquake and the following year hostilities between Spanish and Mapuches, which had begun farther north, reached Osorno. Osorno was destroyed again by the indigenous Huilliche people in October 1602. The destruction of Osorno forced Spaniards and the remaining indigenous allies to migrate south to the vicinity of Chiloé Archipelago where Spanish rule was still upheld. Indigenous allies the followed the Spanish on their departure were declared indios reyunos and became free of encomienda and held the duty to form a militia. The indios reyunos settled chiefly in Calbuco and Abtao. Fernando de Alvarado, an exile from Osorno, led the Spanish resistance in Chiloé against Dutch invaders in 1643. During the crisis that preceded the Battle of Río Bueno Captain Ignacio Carrera Yturgoyen penetrated with an army from Carelmapu north to the vicinity of the ruins of Osorno where his expedition were approached by Huilliches who handed over three "caciques", allegedly responsible for the murders of the survivors of the wreck of San José.

The plains of Osorno and the whole area between Valdivia and the settlements of Calbuco and Carelmapu remained independent indigenous territory closed to the Spanish. The Spanish had thus little information on this territory and had to rely on hearsay. This lack of concrete knowledge of the territory fueled speculations about the mythical City of the Caesars.

New Osorno

On 22 November 1792, Tomás de Figueroa who headed a military expedition from Valdivia took possession of the ruins. The Parliament of Las Canoas held in 1793 established anew peace between Spanish and Mapuche-Huilliche. The treaty allowed for Spanish control of a strip of land between Rahue (the known as Río de Las Canoas) and Damas rivers, which including the area of Osorno. Local chiefs Catrihuala, Iñil and Caniu from around Osorno, and other from farther away, participated in the meeting.

Under the orders of Ambrosio O'Higgins, Osorno was again rebuilt by Juan Mackenna, and declared officially re-populated in 1796. O'Higgins, in turn, was awarded the title of Marquess of Osorno. The new settlers of Osorno soon begun to purchase land from the local indigenous families of Catrihuala, Caniu and Colin. These purchases were permitted by local governor Juan Mackenna, who did however claim to have prevented local Huilliche sell lands they needed for subsistence. According Mackenna local caciques sold land to purchase liquour.

Osorno owes its legacy to fairly recent Chilean settlement, when the government subdued the region's indigenous Mapuche peoples in the mid-19th century and opened the land to Chilean and European immigration soon to follow. A large percentage of locals in Osorno are descendants of Spanish (the livestock grazing industry owes its foundation to the Basques) and other European immigrants.

Around 1850, the government of Chile began inviting German settlers to the colony to promote growth in the region; the settlers found Osorno's climate and geography to be very similar to their own. It continues to have a thriving German secondary school. With their help, Osorno was made the home of the National Cattle ranch of Chile, boosting the regional economy significantly. Present-day Osorno has preserved 19th century architecture and urban layout, represented by six picturesque houses which have been designated national monuments.

Osorno has a long history of rivalry with Valdivia, and in a 2006 referendum, the Osorno Province rejected its proposed incorporation into the new Los Ríos Region, of which Valdivia is now the capital.

In 2019 the water supply system of Osorno was contaminated with 1,100 liters of petrol ushering an sanitary and environmental crisis. The crisis led to the water supply system of Osorno to be shut down from July 10 to July 21. The oil spill also effected Rahue River. ESSAL, the private company in charge of the water supply of Osorno, did not specify the reason for the shut down in the first communique. The government announced that President Sebastián Piñera had canceled a visit to the United States to instead solve the crisis in Osorno. Opposition deputy Emilia Nuyado denounced a media circus on behalf of the government after the water shortage continued following Piñera's visit to the city. Inhabitants of the city went to streets of Osorno to protest calling for the cancellation of ESSAL's water supply concession. ESSAL was to give total discount of 63,250 Chilean pesos (2019) to each of the 47,519 affected clients. In a popular consultation held in Osorno following the 2019 Chilean protests over 90% of the participants voted to end ESSAL's concession. Results are however not binding.

Climate
Osorno has an oceanic climate (Köppen climate classification Cfb) with a drying trend in summer. Snowfalls are rare. In some years, many days can go without a day of precipitation such as the case in 1992 when only  of precipitation was recorded in January while in other years, some summers can have several wet days in a row. Temperatures can occasionally exceed  anytime from December to March.

The city

Osorno sits in sight of Volcán Osorno, an active but minor volcano. The city's most prominent geographical feature is the Rahue River that runs north–south through its center. A smaller stream breaks off as well, running east before turning south and giving the city some natural boundaries. Located near the river front on the east side is the city's heart, the Plaza de Armas, a large, one-block park with fountains, benches, and tree-lined avenues. On the park's east side is La Catedral of Saint Matthew, one of the city's major landmarks, notable for its modern architecture. The cathedral serves as mother church of the Catholic Diocese of Osorno. Along the south side is Juan Mackenna Avenue, the city's major city centre street. Other points of interest are the main campus of the Universidad de Los Lagos and the Osorno Rodeo Stadium.  The recently opened casino Plaza Sol de los Lagos is a new popular attraction for tourists and locals alike.

Osorno hosts a number of annual celebrations. The Festival de la Carne y la Leche (Milk and Meat Festival) is a music festival held annually in late January, features performances by national music pop singers and bands. The Festival del Folklore Campesino (Country Folk Festival) held annually in mid-January, features performances of regional music folk artists.

Another celebration is the Feria Ganadera Sago Fisur (Sago-Fisur Cattle Fair) held annually in early November, hosted by the largest ranch in the area highlights the current state of agricultural activity. Fireworks displays are held every year around the city on 18 September, the Chilean national Day, commemorating independence from Spain.

Osorno is also a gateway for many tourist attractions. Puyehue National Park is a major attraction, with pristine lakes, forests, and game preserves. The volcanic area provides natural hot springs, now the site of the Aguas Calientes spa. Puyehue Hot Springs is adjacent to the park.

Los Lagos Region was named for the many lakes in the area, many of which have tourist-friendly yet isolated beaches; closest to Osorno are Puyehue and Rupanco.
Antillanca ski resort, less than a hundred kilometers away, is one of the highest-quality resorts in Chile. Ecotourism is also encouraged by the indigenous Huilliche communities, who inhabit the Pacific coastal zone. Much of the funds brought in by tourism is being used to protect native plant and tree species, most notably the Alerce, a threatened Cypress. The thick forests open onto a number of beaches and bays, such as Maicolpué, Bahía Mansa and Pucatrihue.

Sports
Football and basketball are popular sports in the city. Osorno fields a football team, Provincial Osorno, in the  Fourth level national football league. Provincial Osorno plays home games at the Estadio Ruben Marcos Peralta, which has a seating capacity of 10,000.

Osorno's professional basketball team in the top level National Basketball League is called Osorno Básquetbol. Their home games are held at the Gimnasio María Gallardo, which has a seating capacity of almost 4,500.

Chilean rodeo is popular in Osorno, as it is in most of the center-south zone of the country. Osorno's rodeo stadium, the Medialuna de Osorno, is considered one of the best in the country, and was the qualifying arena for the southern region of the national rodeo in 2006.

Boxing is also one of the city's pastimes; Osorno produced Chile's boxing representative at the 1972 Summer Olympics, Martín Vargas. Additionally, the mountainous terrain surrounding Osorno is used for skiing and snowboarding, sports popularized by the large tide of German immigrants. It is the closest city to the Antillanca ski resort, only 98 km away.

Economy

Osorno is an important agricultural center, and agriculture makes up the bulk of the Osorno province's economic activity. Wheat and oats grow abundantly, but the land is also well-suited to the breeding of Chilean horses and cattle. Some of Chile's finest beef products originate in the Osorno ranches.

Osorno's proximity to the Cardenal Antonio Samoré Pass makes it a key place the national economy. The mountain pass connects Osorno to the Argentine city of Bariloche, and is one of primary arteries that ties the two countries' southern regions together. The pass is particularly important due to the fact that it crosses the Andes mountains at very low altitude, allowing it to remain open even when other passes are blocked by snow.

Despite all this, Osorno has seen some economic stagnation in the past several decades. Agriculture alone has not allowed it to keep pace with the booming, rapidly industrializing Chilean economy; Osorno lacks both industrial and information-services sectors. In one effort to combat this, the city has forged international business ties with several Dutch companies, after it was discovered that the local climate is ideal for the growing of tulips. Likewise, Osorno has recently entered the international meat market. Besides offering high-quality beef, the isolated region is also completely free of the recent rash of cattle plagues such as Mad Cow and foot-and-mouth disease, guaranteeing the safety of Chilean meats.

Osorno is now faced with a unique opportunity: the arable land is suited for the growing of beets, soy, and corn, crops rising in popularity with the recent development of biocombustibles: fuels derived from crops, such as corn-derived ethanol. It is hoped that the Chilean government's announcement that it will not apply the same steep taxes to agricultural fuels as it does to petroleum products, as well as the increasing demand for more environment-friendly fuels, will mean that Osorno will again become a major economic hub.

As Chile continues to develop as one of South America's economic leaders and one of the most stable states in the region, tourism is on the rise

Transportation
The city is served by Canal Bajo Carlos Hott Siebert Airport, which offers 2-hour flights to Santiago. Buses also depart for the capital daily. The Cardenal Antonio Samoré Pass also marks the city as a major gateway to and from Argentina.

Education
International schools
Lycée Claude Gay
Instituto Alemán de Osorno

Religion 
St. Matthew's Cathedral, Osorno, located in the city of Osorno, is the mother church of the Roman Catholic Diocese of Osorno.

Demographics
Of these, 132,245 (90.9%) lived in urban areas and 13,230 (9.1%) in rural areas. The population grew by 13.9% (17,706 persons) between the 1992 and 2002 censuses.

Notable residents
Tomás Burgos, Philanthropist 
Adolfo Matthei, Agricultural engineer. Founder local agricultural school.
Luis "Colin" Ramirez, Singer, Musician, Actor.
Eleuterio Ramírez, Chilean Army officer during de Pacific War against Perú and Bolivia. Also called Hero of Tarapacá. 
Martín Vargas, Olympic boxer 
Juan Mackenna, Governor of Osorno, hero of Chilean independence. 
Pablo Longueira, politician
Erik Carrasco, professional basketball player
Klaus von Storch, first Chilean astronaut trainee
Alexis Caiguan, member of the Chilean Constitutional Convention

Administration
As a commune, Osorno is a third-level administrative division of Chile administered by a municipal council, headed by an alcalde who is directly elected every four years. The 2008-2012 alcalde is Jaime Alberto Bertin Valenzuela.

Within the electoral divisions of Chile, Osorno is represented in the Chamber of Deputies by Fidel Espinoza (PS), Javier Hernández (UDI), Harry Jürgensen (RN) and Emilia Nuyado (PS) as part of the 25th electoral district. The commune is represented in the Senate by Rabindranath Quinteros Lara (PS) and Iván Alejandro Moreira Barros (UDI) as part of the 17th senatorial constituency (Los Lagos Region).

Gallery

References

Bibliography

External links

  Municipality of Osorno
Information and Pictures of Osorno
 Diario Austral de Osorno Osorno's major newspaper
 OsornoChile.Net - Information and Pictures of Osorno
Images of Osorno Chileno's Chile Travel Blog
 Osorno Sports and News Portal
Osorno on Google Maps

 
Communes of Chile
Capitals of Chilean provinces
Populated places established in 1558
1558 establishments in the Captaincy General of Chile
1602 disestablishments in the Captaincy General of Chile
Populated places established in 1796
1796 establishments in the Captaincy General of Chile
Colonial fortifications in Chile
Populated places in Osorno Province
1558 establishments in the Spanish Empire
Former ghost towns
Destroyed cities
1796 establishments in the Spanish Empire